Quantum Air (formerly known as AeBal, Aerolíneas de Baleares) was an airline based in Madrid, Spain. It operated domestic scheduled services within Spain, as well as charter and ACMI operations all over Europe. Its fleet was originally wet-leased to Spanair for use on domestic and international routes, but since 14 September 2008, they have operated on their own.

History

Aerolíneas de Baleares
IATA Code: DF 
ICAO Code: ABH 
Callsign: Air Balear

AeBal was established in 1999 with headquarters in Son Sant Joan Airport, Palma de Mallorca. Originally it was intended to be named AB Bluestar but the name was changed to AeBal, Aerolíneas de Baleares. The company started operations on 5 July 2000 from Madrid with domestic services and an initial fleet of three Boeing 717 aircraft. It was owned by Grupo Marsans (51%), SAS Group (25%), Spanair (18%) and VITRAC (6%). The company operated under the name AeBal-Spanair Link, retaining much of its Spanair pedigree in the livery. It had 155 employees in March 2007. A number of changes in the shareholding structure of the company ended up with SAS Group owning 100% of the company.

AeBal ceased operations on 16 September 2008, as part of the Spanair economic restructuring plan, canceling their wet-lease agreement.

Quantum Air
AeBal ceased to exist after it was sold by SAS in January 2009 to Proturin, a Spanish investment company controlled by former Aerolíneas Argentinas CEO, Antonio Mata. In March 2009, AeBal was replaced by Quantum Air and its main base was moved from Mallorca to Madrid Barajas Airport. Mata tried unsuccessfully to replace the ageing MD-87 with newer Boeing 717. After several defaults in the payments of the plane leases, SAS made a move to impound the fleet and the planes were grounded during the legal squabbles that followed between SAS and Antonio Mata. 
On 26 January 2010 Quantum Air temporarily ceased operations and ticketing. Finally in October 2012 a court in Palma de Mallorca issued a verdict in favour of the company, ordering SAS to pay 6.3 million €.

Destinations
Quantum Air operated to the following domestic scheduled destinations (as of July 2009):

Spain
Bilbao - Bilbao Airport
Fuerteventura - Fuerteventura Airport
Gran Canaria - Gran Canaria Airport
Lanzarote - Lanzarote Airport
Madrid - Adolfo Suárez Madrid–Barajas Airport - base
Palma de Mallorca - Palma de Mallorca Airport - base
Tenerife - Tenerife North–Ciudad de La Laguna Airport
Málaga - Málaga Airport
Sevilla - San Pablo Airport
Alicante - Alicante–Elche Miguel Hernández Airport

Fleet

The Quantum Air fleet consisted of the following aircraft as of November 12, 2009. The entire fleet was delivered starting September 2010 to Blue1.

References

External links

Official website (dead link, replaced by an unrelated website) (Japanese)

Airlines established in 1999
Airlines disestablished in 2010
Defunct airlines of Spain
Former Star Alliance affiliate members
Spanish companies established in 1999
Spanish companies disestablished in 2010